Olli Ohtonen (born 27 April 1979) is a Finnish cross-country skier. He competed in the men's 15 kilometre classical event at the 2006 Winter Olympics.

Cross-country skiing results
All results are sourced from the International Ski Federation (FIS).

Olympic Games

World Championships

World Cup

Season standings

References

External links
 

1979 births
Living people
Finnish male cross-country skiers
Olympic cross-country skiers of Finland
Cross-country skiers at the 2006 Winter Olympics
Sportspeople from Helsinki